Charlie Mars is a vocalist, guitarist and singer-songwriter from Mississippi. Mars has performed at Austin City Limits and South by Southwest. Mars was featured in Esquire Magazine's Songwriting Challenge which he says was his brainchild.

Biography
Mars was born in Laurel, Mississippi and grew up in Oxford and Jackson, Mississippi. Mars' parents are David and Sylvia. Mars has two brothers, Sam and Chad. Mars was transformed to a musician at age 15 or 16, when he heard "Thriller" and "Slippery When Wet". The first Violent Femmes record also figured significantly into his development as a musician. He bought everything that had a similar sound. Mars' family moved to Jackson, Mississippi when he was a senior in high school. He graduated from Jackson Preparatory School in 1992. He was lead singer and guitarist in a band called Adley Madidafus in high school. Mars attended Southern Methodist University in Dallas, Texas. Mars started playing for Jack Ingram in 1992 ("The Charlie Mars Band").

Mars has a floating, mellow croon combined with sensual soul-rock arrangements. Mars has been compared to Jason Mraz and Josh Rouse, and described as a tougher edged version of Jeff Buckley. Mars says that songs come to him spontaneously, and that he relies on the quality and memorability of the material to remember what he creates. Mars says "...the stuff that's any good I remember, and the crap I just forget. I'm a firm believer in the hypothesis that the good shit sticks."

Personal
In 2010 Mars said he would like to live in Austin, Texas if not for his then-girlfriend Mary-Louise Parker, actress on West Wing, Fried Green Tomatoes, and Weeds. As of 2012, he was living in Brooklyn, New York.

Discography
 Broken Arrow by Charlie Mars Band (1995), Dualtone Music
 Born & Razed by Charlie Mars (1997), Rockingham Records
 End of Romance by Charlie Mars (1999), Rockingham Records
 Charlie Mars by Charlie Mars (2004), V2 North America
 EP by Charlie Mars (2009), Dualtone Music
 Like a Bird Like a Plane (Dig) by Charlie Mars (2009), Thirty Tigers
 Blackberry Light (2012), Rockingham Records
 The Money (2014), Rockingham Records
 Beach Town (2018), Rockingham Records

References

External links
 Times Magazine Interview
 Charlie Mars Facebook page

1974 births
Living people
American rock songwriters
American acoustic guitarists
American male guitarists
American folk guitarists
American rock guitarists
American rock singers
American folk singers
Singer-songwriters from Mississippi
Southern Methodist University alumni
Guitarists from Mississippi
21st-century American male singers
21st-century American singers
21st-century American guitarists
American male singer-songwriters